The Screaming Staircase is a young adult, supernatural thriller novel by Jonathan Stroud. It is the first book in the series Lockwood & Co., and was released on 29 August 2013 by Random House in the United Kingdom, and by Disney-Hyperion in the United States on 17 September 2013.

The story is set in a version of modern-day London experiencing an event called "the Problem," ghosts which appear throughout the city at nighttime and attack the living. Agencies have been created to fend off the ghosts and protect the public for a fee. However, only certain children and teenagers have the "talent" to sense the ghosts, which they gradually lose as they reach their twenties. The agencies are run by those who have passed the ghost-sensitive age, and the agents are the youth with the talents necessary to solve the hauntings, which puts them in danger in the process.

The story follows Lucy Carlyle and Lockwood & Co., the only supernatural agency in London run by children. The agency is led by Anthony Lockwood and has one other member prior to Lucy's joining, George Cubbins. As the series progresses, they investigate and solve hauntings and find deeper truths behind the ghosts and the Problem.

Synopsis
A sinister Problem has occurred in London: all nature of ghosts, haunts, and spectres are appearing throughout the city, and they are not exactly friendly. Only young people have the psychic abilities required to see and eradicate these unnatural foes. Many different Detection Agencies have cropped up to handle the dangerous work, and they are in fierce competition for business. In The Screaming Staircase, the plucky and talented Lucy Carlyle teams up with Anthony Lockwood, the charismatic leader of Lockwood & Co, a small agency that runs independent of any adult supervision. After an assignment leads to both a grisly discovery and a disastrous end, Lucy, Anthony, and their sarcastic colleague, George, are forced to take part in the perilous investigation of Combe Carey Hall, one of the most haunted houses in England.

Characters
Lucy Carlyle: The newest member of Lockwood & Co. and the narrator of the book, Lucy is 15 years old, and is described as quick to start a fight. She was known in earlier revisions as Lucy Purser. The daughter of a stationmaster in the North of England, she joined a local agency at an early age. However, after a disastrous case resulting in the loss of her fellow agents, Lucy left her former employment and family to start again in London. Lucy's Talent lies in her hearing and empathy through touch.
Anthony Lockwood: The leader of Lockwood & Co., often referred to as just Lockwood. He is described as "dashing" and "a bit reckless". His Talent is a sharp "sight" - seeing ghosts and deathglows, the psychic residue left by a violent death. Lockwood is known for his quick yet thorough approach to hauntings and prides himself on his abilities. He is a mysterious young man; orphaned and left with the family's property.
George Cubbins: Anthony's deputy, and quite cynical. He is rather portly and a little slovenly. George is much more focused on research and preparation than the other two agents, and prefers a longer waiting time between assignments. He rarely gets along with his fellow agent Lucy, but he shares a strong passion with Lockwood. He is also quite attached to a skull in a glass jar which he owns. The skull is possessed by a ghost.
Suzie Martin: The daughter of Mrs. Hope, she meets Lockwood & Co. in her mother's absence, so they can investigate the presence of a Visitor in her family's home. She is quite sceptical of how young the agency is. 
Annie Ward: A young woman who returns as a type-two ghost following her death. Lockwood & Co. encounter her at the beginning of the book, and then go on to solve the mystery of her murder. Her Source is a locket which Lockwood and Co. found around the neck of her corpse. She and Lucy share a strong psychic connection.
Inspector Barnes: An investigator of DEPRAC (Department of Psychical Research and Control), which is based at Scotland Yard. Barnes seems to disapprove of and possibly dislike Lockwood and George, however cooperates with them in the case of Annie Ward
Sir John William Fairfax: The wealthy industrialist who owns the haunted Combe Carey Hall, assigns Lockwood & Co. the mystery within the mansion and offers them the money needed to save the company from debt.
Hugo Blake: Annie Ward's 22-year-old boyfriend, who was accused of murdering Annie Ward.

Sequels
A sequel to the book, titled The Whispering Skull, was released in September 2014. A second sequel, titled The Hollow Boy, was released in September 2015. The fourth book in the series, The Creeping Shadow, was released in September 2016. The final book, The Empty Grave, was released in September 2017. A related book, The Dagger in the Desk, was released in February 2015.

Adaptations
The film rights were acquired in December 2012 by Illumination Entertainment and Universal Pictures, making this the first live-action project for the former. The film, titled Lockwood & Co.: The Screaming Staircase, was to be produced by Illumination Entertainment CEO Chris Meledandri. However, in September 2017 it was announced that Big Talk Productions had optioned the rights to Lockwood & Co., with plans to adapt it into a television series. In December 2020, the show was announced to be going to Netflix, adapted by Joe Cornish. Filming began on the Lockwood & Co. television series in the week following 5 July 2021, and it premiered on 27 January 2023.

Reception
The Screaming Staircase has received the following accolades:

 Cybils Award (Speculative Fiction) (2013)
 Goodreads Choice Award (Middle Grade & Children's)(2013)
 Los Angeles Times Book Prize (2014)
 Mystery Writers of America's Edgar Awards (Best Juvenile)(2014)
 Jewish Community Secondary School's WeRead Prize (2014)
 BookTrust and Amazon Kindle's Booktrust Best Book Awards shortlist (9-11 Best Story) (2014)
 North Carolina Young Adult Book Award nominee (2014)
 Carnegie Medal for Literature nominee (2014)
 Worcestershire Public Libraries' Worcestershire Teen Book Award shortlist (2014)
 Silver Inky Award shortlist (2014)
 International Librarians of Japan's Sakura Medal nominee (2015)
 Stratford Girls' Grammar School's Warwickshire Secondary Book Awards (2015)
 Coventry City Council's Coventry Inspiration Book Awards shortlist (2015)
 UKYA Blogger Awards' UKYA Blogger Awards nominee (2015)
 The Weald School's Weald Book Award shortlist (2015)
 American Library Association's Popular Paperbacks for Young Adults (2015)
 Children's Literature Association of Utah Beehive Book Awards nominee (Young Adult Fiction) (2016)
 Nevada Library Association's Nevada Young Readers' Award (Intermediate) (2016)
 Washington Library Association's Sasquatch Award nominee (2016)
 Rebecca Caudill Young Readers' Book Award nominee (2017)

References

2013 British novels
British young adult novels
British thriller novels
Ghost novels
Random House books